The 2018–19 season of the Scottish Basketball Championship Women, the national women's basketball league of Scotland.

Format
Each team plays each other twice, once home, once away, for a total of 16 games.

Results

Regular season

Playoffs
Quarter-finals

Semi-finals

Final

Scottish Cup

1st Round

Quarter-finals

Semi-finals

Final

References

basketball
basketball